Malcolm D. Jones (born April 18, 1997) is an American soccer player.

Career
Jones began his youth career with in the Chivas USA Academy before joining the LA Galaxy Academy in 2013.  On February 4, 2015, it was announced that Jones signed a letter of intent to play college soccer at UCLA.  On July 11, Jones made his professional debut for LA Galaxy II in a 4–0 victory over Sacramento Republic FC.

Jones was able to maintain his college eligibility despite appearing for Los Dos and on August 29, he made his collegiate debut and scored the game winner in the Bruins 1–0 victory over New Mexico.

References

External links
USSF Development Academy bio
U.S. Soccer bio

1997 births
Living people
American soccer players
UCLA Bruins men's soccer players
LA Galaxy II players
Association football defenders
Soccer players from California
USL Championship players
United States men's youth international soccer players
United States men's under-20 international soccer players